The Wood is a public park in Surbiton in the Royal Borough of Kingston upon Thames in London. Part of it is a bird sanctuary named after the naturalist Richard Jefferies. According to Natural England it is managed by the London Wildlife Trust, but as of August 2015 it is not on the Trust's list of sites. The 1.5-hectare site is designated as a Local Nature Reserve called 'The Wood and Richard Jefferies Bird Sanctuary'.

The Woods was a nineteenth century house which had a lake and woods in its grounds. In the 1930s the house was demolished, and in 1947 Surbiton Council compulsorily purchased the site and turned it into a park. In 1980 the upper part of the park was fenced off to form the bird sanctuary, which has been managed by the London Wildlife Trust since 1987.

The site is wooded, and has typical woodland birds such as great spotted woodpeckers and tawny owls. Invertebrates include stag beetles.

There is access from Oak Hill Grove.

References

Nature reserves in the Royal Borough of Kingston upon Thames
London Wildlife Trust
Local nature reserves in Greater London
Surbiton
Buildings and structures demolished in the 1930s